Tojol-ab'al is a Mayan language spoken in Chiapas, Mexico by the Tojolabal people. Tojol-ab'al is spoken, principally in the departments of the Chiapanecan Colonia of Las Margaritas, by about 70,000 people. It is related to the Chuj language.

The name Tojolabal derives from the phrase , meaning "right language".  Nineteenth-century documents sometimes refer to the language and its speakers as "Chaneabal" (meaning "four languages", possibly a reference to the four Mayan languages – Tzotzil, Tzeltal, Tojolabal, and Chuj—spoken in the Chiapas highlands and nearby lowlands along the Guatemala border).

Anthropologist Carlos Lenkersdorf has claimed several linguistic and cultural features of the Tojolabal, primarily the language's  ergativity, show that they do not give cognitive weight to the distinctions subject/object, active/passive. This he interprets as being evidence in favor of the controversial Sapir-Whorf hypothesis.

The official Writing Standard of the Tojol-ab’al Language (In Tojol-ab’al: Skujlayub'il Sts'ijb'ajel K'umal Tojol-ab'al, Spanish: Norma de Escritura de la Lengua Tojol-ab’al) was published in 2011 by the Instituto Nacional de Lenguas Indígenas, used for indigenous education. It established an official alphabet, grammar rules and other linguistic aspects.

Tojol-abʼal-language programming is carried by the National Institute of Indigenous Peoples radio station XEVFS, broadcasting from Las Margaritas.

Alphabet 
According to the Writing Standard, the alphabet in Tojol-ab’al is oficially known as Tsome sat ts'ijb'anel (sign set), it’s is integrated by 28 letters, 23 consonants and 5 vowels, the order and their denomination in Tojol-ab’al are the following:

Phonology

Consonants 

 [] is mostly heard from Spanish loanwords.
 Voiced stop sounds [, ] are also heard from Spanish loanwords.

Vowels

References

External links 
 Tojolabʼal Collection of Jill Brody at the Archive of the Indigenous Languages of Latin America, including audio recordings. Access is restricted but available to researchers by request. 

Mayan languages
Mesoamerican languages
Agglutinative languages
Indigenous languages of Mexico

Languages of Mexico